Jonathan "Johnny" Kevin Bennett (born 10 June 1998) is an English actor, who played Liam Gallagher in Shameless.

He took over from Joseph Furnace from series 3 onwards and continued to play the role until series 8. He lives in Manchester but comes from an Irish family.

References

External links

English male child actors
Living people
1998 births
Irish male child actors
Male actors from Manchester
People educated at Parrs Wood High School